Kyle Segebart (born June 22, 1987 in Winter Haven, Florida) is an American soccer player who is currently as assistant coach with the western Washington Vikings

Career

Youth and Amateur
Segebart grew up in Dayton, Ohio, attended Northmont High School, and played club soccer for CGSA Strikers, Dayton Galaxies and Ohio Elite SA, before beginning his college soccer career at University of Rio Grande. He transferred to Cedarville University prior to his sophomore year, and played three seasons for the Yellowjackets. He appeared in 17 matches with 15 starts during his first season at Cedarville, and was voted to the All-AMC South Division Second Team, before finishing his college career at Shorter University.

During his college years Segebart also played extensively in the USL Premier Development League, for Cascade Surge, Mississippi Brilla and the Cincinnati Kings.

Professional
Segebart played with the Dayton Dutch Lions in the PDL in 2010, and turned professional in 2011 after the Lions self-promoted to the USL Professional Division in 2011. He made his professional debut on April 16, 2011 in Dayton's first game of the 2011 season, a 2-1 loss to Charleston Battery.

References

External links
 Western Washington bio
 Team Wellington Bio
 Dayton Dutch Lions profile
 Cedarville bio

1987 births
Living people
American soccer players
Cascade Surge players
Mississippi Brilla players
Cincinnati Kings players
Dayton Dutch Lions players
USL League Two players
USL Championship players
Team Wellington players
Soccer players from Florida
Sportspeople from Dayton, Ohio
Association football defenders
Dayton Flyers men's soccer coaches
Franklin Grizzlies men's soccer coaches
Saginaw Valley State Cardinals men's soccer coaches
Western Washington Vikings men's soccer coaches
Soccer players from Ohio